Portland station may refer to:

Train stations

In Australia
 Portland railway station, Victoria

In the United States

Maine
 Portland Transportation Center, the current Amtrak station
 Union Station (Portland, Maine), a former station

Oregon
 Union Station (Portland, Oregon)

In the United Kingdom
 Great Portland Street tube station, in London
 Portland railway station (England), in Portland, Dorset

Other uses
 Portland Fire Station No. 7, in Portland, Oregon, USA
 Portland Fire Station No. 23, in Portland, Oregon, USA

See also
 Portland (disambiguation)